The 2020–21 season was the 113th season in the existence of R.S.C. Anderlecht and the club's 85th consecutive season in the top flight of Belgian football. In addition to the domestic league, Anderlecht participated in this season's edition of the Belgian Cup. The season covered the period from 1 July 2020 to 30 June 2021.

Players

First-team squad

Out on loan

Transfers

In

Out

Pre-season and friendlies

Competitions

Overview

Belgian First Division A

Regular season

Results summary

Results by round

Matches
The league fixtures were announced on 8 July 2020.

Play-Off I

Results summary

Results by round

Matches

Belgian Cup

Statistics

Squad appearances and goals
Last updated 23 May 2021

|-
! colspan=14 style=background:#dcdcdc; text-align:center|Goalkeepers

|-
! colspan=14 style=background:#dcdcdc; text-align:center|Defenders

|-
! colspan=14 style=background:#dcdcdc; text-align:center|Midfielders

|-
! colspan=14 style=background:#dcdcdc; text-align:center|Forwards

|-
! colspan=14 style=background:#dcdcdc; text-align:center|Players who have made an appearance this season but have left the club

|}

Goalscorers

Notes

References

External links

R.S.C. Anderlecht seasons
Anderlecht